Meegwun Fairbrother is a Canadian actor. He is most noted for his role as Owen Beckbie in the television drama series Burden of Truth, for which he was a Canadian Screen Award nominee for Best Supporting Actor in a Drama Program or Series at the 10th Canadian Screen Awards in 2022.

References

External links

21st-century Canadian male actors
Canadian male television actors
Canadian male film actors
First Nations male actors
Ojibwe people
Living people
Year of birth missing (living people)